OWWA may refer to:

Ontario Water Works Association
Organization of Women Writers of Africa
Overseas Workers Welfare Administration